The Libyan Army was the branch of the Armed Forces of the Libyan Arab Jamahiriya, the Libyan Arab Republic and the Libyan Kingdom responsible for ground warfare.

History 
When Libya gained its independence in 1951, veterans of the original Sanusi Army formed the nucleus of the Royal Libyan Army. Though the Libyan army has a large amount of fighting equipment at its disposal, the vast majority was bought from the Soviet Union in the 1970s and 1980s and was largely obsolete at the time of the First Civil War in 2011. A high percentage remains in storage and a large amount of equipment has also been sold to various African countries. The Libyan Army was generally regarded as neither efficient nor well trained.

Libyan Arab Jamahiriya period 
From the late seventies to the mid to late eighties the army was involved in four major incursions across the Chadian border. The Libyan Army suffered great losses in these conflicts especially that of the Toyota War of 1987 largely due to poor tactics and western aid to Chad. All of these incursions were eventually repulsed and Libya no longer occupies Chad. This conflict was known as the Chadian–Libyan conflict. In February 2011, the First Civil War broke out and several units of the army mutinied and defected to the opposition, with battles taking place across much of the country.

In September 2011, the pre-civil war Libyan Army had been effectively destroyed by a combination of NATO air strikes and combat with rebel forces, with the Libyan Army forces still loyal to Gaddafi abandoning their posts in Tripoli as the rebels took the city, and the remnants of Gaddafi's loyalist army holed up in Sirte, Sabha and Bani Walid.

Strength 
In 2009 the International Institute for Strategic Studies estimated that the Ground Forces of the Libyan Arab Jamahiriya numbered 25,000 with an additional, estimated, 25,000 conscripts (total estimated 50,000). The IISS estimated that the Ground Forces were organised into 11 Border Defence and 4 Security Zones, one regime security brigade (the 32nd Khamis Brigade), 10 Tank Battalions, 10 Mechanised Infantry Battalions, 18 Infantry Battalions, 6 Commando Battalions, 22 Artillery Battalions, 4 Surface-to-Surface missile Brigades and 7 Air Defence Artillery Battalions.
Doctrine is a mixture of Egyptian doctrine which was adopted after the 1969 coup and socialist principles derived from the concepts of a People's Army.

Equipment 
Since the end of the First Libyan Civil War in late 2011, there have been rumors of organized pro-Gaddafi resistance. However, with the exception of a few attacks and car bombings from 2012 to 2014, an organized resistance movement never truly materialized. Instead, the late Libyan leader's second son, Saif al-Islam Gaddafi, is attempting to reclaim his father's power through political means, and attempted to register as a candidate in the 2021 Libyan presidential election but was rejected. This decision was reversed less than a month later, restoring him as a presidential candidate for the elections, which are now set to take place in 2023.

The situation could have been very different if a series of car bombings in Tripoli in August 2012 had not occurred. Authorities traced the bombings to a militia in control of a military storage facility in Tarhuna, near Tripoli. Their control of the facility since the 2011 revolution appeared to have gone unnoticed by authorities, who were still preoccupied with forming a government and disarming rebellious armed groups. The Katibat al-Awfiya (Brigade of the Faithful) militia had successfully posed as anti-Gaddafi forces while plotting a return to Gaddafi's system. In fact, the militia was known internally as the "Brigade of Martyr Muammar Qaddafi"!

The brigade's military storage facility was not just any storage facility; it was the largest of its kind in Africa, housing hundreds of field-guns, self-propelled guns (SPGs), multiple rocket launchers (MRLs), and even Scud ballistic missile launchers. Without the car bombings and even a temporary takeover of Tripoli International Airport in June 2012, the 'Brigade of Martyr Muammar Qaddafi's' activities at the military complex might have gone unnoticed long enough for it to amass the necessary strength to launch a coup d'etat. Indeed, the complex housed Africa's fourth largest artillery arsenal, only surpassed by Algeria, Egypt, and Morocco!

Despite the fact that most of the rocket artillery systems at the complex had been stored here for at least two decades with little maintenance (following the exodus of foreign contractors in the 1990s), their protective hangars and fabric covers ensured that the majority remained in excellent condition. Some of the stored artillery pieces had been damaged after Coalition aircraft struck 40 of the complex's 46 hangars during the NATO-led military intervention in Libya in 2011. The 'Brigade of Martyr Muammar Qaddafi' had already repaired numerous artillery guns and was in the process of repairing many more by cannibalizing other systems for spare parts.

The Tarhuna complex was originally built in the late 1970s or early 1980s to serve as a military equipment storage, repair, and maintenance facility. During the 1970s, Gaddafi embarked on a massive buying spree to turn Libya into "The Arsenal of Islam". As part of this ambitious project, he acquired military equipment far in excess of his own military's requirements. Many of the weapons systems acquired would be immediately stored upon arrival in Libya, and while some of this equipment would later be donated to friendly countries in the Middle East, South America, Africa (as well as North Korea), others would never leave the storage depot where they first arrived. In fact, when rebels stormed a massive tank storage complex in Sukna in 2011, they discovered a plethora of T-55 MBTs, MTU-55 bridgelayers, BMP-1 IFVs, and BTR-60PB APCs that had never even been issued to units. Having been purchased in the 1970s to participate in a global war with the United States and Israel that never materialized, they were instead pressed into service with rebel forces seeking to end Gaddafi's 42-year reign.

Many of the SPGs and MRLs stored at the complex were last driven in 1999, when they took part in Tripoli's 30th Anniversary of the Revolution parade. Gaddafi organized a massive parade that featured nearly every type of weapon system acquired by the Libyan Army to bolster his bid to launch the African Union and to show the world that Libya was still a force to be reckoned with despite ten years of crippling sanctions. Ironically, many of these systems had already been condemned to long-term storage and had to be reactivated specifically for the parade. Gaddafi went so far as to order the Libyan Air Force to reactivate one of its retired Tu-22 bombers for a flyover over the parade ground in order to impress his audience. The aircraft, which had not flown in more than ten years, vibrated so much during the flight that its pilots kissed the ground after landing at Tripoli Mitiga air base and refused to fly it back to its home base Jufra. The Tu-22 was later abandoned at Mitiga. The artillery and MRL pieces that took part in the parade were driven back to Tarhuna and immediately stored, having served their purpose of making Libya's military appear stronger than it was.

The 'Brigade of Martyr Muammar Qaddafi' had attempted to convert several of the complex's artillery pieces into stationary bunkers covering the complex's entrances. Nonetheless, their defenses were eventually breached, resulting in the deaths and arrests of the militia members present. The brigade effectively ceased to exist after their forced eviction from the Tarhuna complex, putting an end to its dream of returning to the days of the Jamahiriya.

Tanks 
The IISS estimated tank numbers in 2009 as 20,025 (not including those proven to have been captured/destroyed by rebels during the Libyan civil war as of 6 June 2011): 150 T-72; 115 in store; 100 T-62; 4620 in store; 5000 T-55; 10,040 T-54/T-55 in store. The IISS estimated there were 500 BRDM-2 and 700 EE-9 Cascavel reconnaissance vehicles, 1000 BMP-1s, plus BMD-1s. Russian official sources reported in 2010 that T-72s would be modernized with help from Russia. 540 BTR-50 and BTR-60s were also reported by the IISS. Other reported wheeled vehicles in service include 1000 EE-11 Urutu, and Polish-Czechoslovak OT-64 SKOT.

Main battle tank
150 T-72
100T-62
5000 T-54/55
Armored personnel carrier
100 EE-11 Urutu
400 M-113
750 BTR-60
500 BTR-50
500 BRDM-2
500 OT-64 SKOT
200 Fiat 6614
Infantry fighting vehicle
1000 BMP-1
580 EE-9 Cascavel

Artillery 
The IISS estimated artillery in service in 2009 as totaling 2,421 pieces. 444 SP artillery pieces were reported; 122mm 1300 2S1 Carnation; 152mm 140: 600 2S3 Akatsiya; 800 M-77 Dana; 155mm 174: 14 M-109; 160 VCA 155 Palmaria. 647+ towed artillery pieces were reported: 105mm 42+ M-101; 122mm 250: 190 D-30; 60 D-74; 130mm 330 M-46; 152mm 25 M-1937. 16000± Multiple rocket launchers were reported: an estimated 3000 107mm Type-63; 122mm 5300: ε2000 BM-11; ε2290 BM-21 Grad; ε1000 RM-70 Dana (RM-70 multiple rocket launcher?). The IISS also estimated that Libya had 500 mortars: 82mm 428; 120mm ε48 M-43; 160mm ε24 M-160. Surface-to-surface missiles reported in service include FROG-7 and SCUD-B, (416 missiles).
Artillery
1300 2S1 Gvozdika
600 2S3 Akatsiya
800 152mm SpGH DANA
? M109 howitzer
210 Palmaria
800–1000 RM-70
2000± BM-21 Grad
800+ Type 63 multiple rocket launcher
450 9K52 Luna-M (FROG-7) short-range ballistic missiles

Anti-tank weapons 
Anti-tank missiles reported in service included 4000 French/German MILAN, and 6200+ AT-3, AT-4, and AT-5, all of Soviet manufacture. Libya also purchased 300 9M123 Khrizantema batteries from Russia prior to the civil war.

Anti-air weapons 
In 2009 the IISS estimated that Libya had Crotale, SA-7 Grail, SA-9/SA-13 surface-to-air missiles, and AA guns in Army service. A separate Air Defence Command has SA-2, SA-3, SA-5 Gammon, and SA-8b Gecko, plus guns.

Many of Libya's air defence systems were destroyed during the civil war, how much, if any, remained intact afterwards is unknown. Many of the anti-aircraft guns captured by rebel forces were turned on Libyan Army ground forces after being bolted onto pick up trucks.

SAM / Vehicle-mounted SAM system
 SA-7 Grail
 9K31 Strela-1 SA-9
 9K35 Strela-10 SA-13
 S-75 Dvina SA-2
 S-125 Neva/Pechora SA-3
 S-200 Angara/Vega/Dubna SA-5
 9K33 Osa SA-8

Reported anti aircraft artillery includes Soviet 57 mm S-60, 23 mm self-propelled ZSU-23-4 and ZU-23-2, Czech M53/59 Praga, and Swedish Bofors 40mm guns.

Small arms 
Small arms reported in service included TT pistol, Beretta M12, FN P90, SKS, AK-47, AK-74, Pistol Mitralieră model 1963/1965 and AKM assault rifles, the FN F2000, Soviet RPD machine gun, RPK machine gun, PK machine guns, DShK heavy machine gun, KPV heavy machine guns, SG-43 Goryunov, and a number of RPG type and anti-aircraft missile systems: RPG-2, RPG-7, 9K32 Strela-2.

Combat experience 
A sharp series of border clashes occurred with Egypt in 1977, and Libyan forces were flown into Uganda in 1978 in an unsuccessful effort to defend Idi Amin's Uganda against invading Tanzanian forces. In addition, the Libyans conducted a series of campaigns in Northern Chad since 1980, launching a campaign against Chad that year and again in 1983. In April 1987, Libya suffered a disastrous defeat in Chad, losing nearly a quarter of its invasion force.

Egypt 

On 19 July 1977, after a protest march by Libyans was stopped by Egyptian border guards, Libyan artillery units fired into Egypt. After further border violations were alleged by both sides, fighting escalated on the same day with an artillery duel, and, two days later, a drive along the coast by Egyptian armor and infantry during which the Libyan army was engaged. Egypt claimed successful surprise air strikes against the Libyan air base at Al Adem, just south of Tobruk, and surface-to-air missile batteries and radar stations were knocked out as well.

When the Egyptians withdrew on 24 July, most foreign analysts agreed that the Egyptian units had prevailed, although Libyan forces responded more effectively than had been expected. Libyan army hailed the encounter as a victory, using the fight as a justification for further purchases of modern armaments.

Uganda 

In the case of Uganda, Libya had intervened on Idi Amin's behalf during his first confrontation with neighboring Tanzania in 1972 by airlifting a contingent of 4000 troops. During the invasion of Uganda by Tanzanian troops and Ugandan exiles in 1978, a new Libyan force estimated at 2,000 to 2,500 was sent, assisting in the defence of Entebbe and Kampala by covering road junctions with armored equipment.

Unprepared and undermotivated Libyan troops were quickly routed in attacks by foot soldiers. As many as 600 Libyans were estimated to have been killed during the Ugandan operation, and the remainder were hurriedly withdrawn. The troops had been led to believe that they were being airlifted into Uganda for training exercises with Ugandan units.

Chad 

After nearly two decades, Col. Muammar Gaddafi's attempts to annex Northern Chad ended in 1987. In just the first three months of 1987, Libya lost almost all the territory it had held in Chad, between $500 million and $1 billion in weapons and one-third of its 15,000 troops. Over 4,494 Libyan soldiers were killed by Chad's forces between January and March 1987.

The Libyan Army was defeated by a force substantially inferior in numbers and equipment. Chad's victory was the result of a combination of Western funding, weapons and intelligence and Chadian courage, tactics and leadership. France provided air cover and troops to protect the Chadian rear areas, while the USA provided $240 million in equipment and weapons. The U.S. also contributed $75 million in emergency military aid, including transport aircraft and air defence systems.

The Chad forces displayed some remarkable tactical innovations: they used Toyota all-terrain vehicles, lightly armored French-made Panhard cars, and Milan antitank and Stinger antiaircraft missiles to destroy Libyan tanks and planes.

Libyan civil war  

In 2011 protests against the rule of Gaddafi started in Libya. They were inspired by similar protests in other Arab countries. Gaddafi used police and mercenary forces to violently suppress the protest. This resulted in an armed uprising in Libya between pro-government and anti-government forces. Parts of the army joined the rebels and weapon depots were plundered by protesters. After initial advances by the rebels, the Libyan Army began a counteroffensive and started pushing back the rebel fighters. On 17 March 2011, the United Nations Security Council passed United Nations Security Council Resolution 1973, authorizing the use of "all necessary means" to protect civilians in Libya, "excluding a foreign occupation force". On Saturday, 19 March 2011, France began enforcement of the resolution by deploying French fighter aircraft over Libyan airspace.

First Battle of Benghazi 17–20 February
Tripoli clashes 17–25 February
Battle of Misrata 18 February – 15 May
First Battle of Zawiya 24 February – 10 March
2011 Nafusa Mountain Campaign 1 March – 18 August
First Battle of Brega 2 March
Battle of Ra's Lanuf 4–12 March
Battle of Bin Jawad 6 March
Second Battle of Brega 13–15 March
Battle of Ajdabiya 15–26 March
Second Battle of Benghazi 19–20 March
First Gulf of Sidra offensive 26–30 March
Third Battle of Brega 31 March – 7 April
Cyrenaican desert campaign 3 April – 12 June
Battle of Brega–Ajdabiya road 8 April – 21 May
Battle of Wazzin 20 April – 29 July
Battle of the Misrata frontline 16 May – 19 August
2011 Sabha clashes 8–13 June
Zliten uprising 9–16 June
Zawiya raid 11–12 June
Battle of Zliten 21 July – 19 August
Fourth Battle of Brega 14 July – 22 August
Fezzan campaign 17 July – 27 September
2011 Msallata clashes 3–9 August
Battle of Tawergha 11–13 August
Battle of Gharyan 13–18 August
Second Battle of Zawiya 13–20 August
2011 Ras Ajdir clashes 13–26 August
2011 Libyan rebel coastal offensive 13–28 August
Douz skirmish 19–20 August
Battle of Tripoli 20–28 August
Second Gulf of Sidra offensive 22 August – 20 October (End of the Libyan civil war)
Battle of Bani Walid 9 September – 17 October
Battle of Sirte 20 October

References

Further reading 
 Kenneth M. Pollack, Arabs at War: Military Effectiveness 1948–91, University of Nebraska Press, Lincoln and London, 2002,

External links 
 Globalsecurity.org, Libyan armed forces

Armies by country
Military of Libya
Military units and formations established in 1951
Military units and formations disestablished in 2011
First Libyan Civil War
1951 establishments in Libya